Chinese people in Iran form one of the smaller groups of overseas Chinese; Iran's total Chinese population is estimated at between 2,000 and 3,000 people.

History
During the Safavid dynasty, Abbas I (reigned 1587–1629) brought 300 Chinese potters to Iran to enhance local production of Chinese-style ceramics. From E. Sykes's "Persia and Its People": "Early in the seventeenth century, Shah Abbas imported Chinese workmen into his country to teach his subjects the art of making porcelain, and the Chinese influence is very strong in the designs on this ware. Chinese marks are also copied, so that to scratch an article is sometimes the only means of proving it to be of Persian manufacture, for the Chinese glaze, hard as iron, will take no mark."

Of the Chinese Li family in Quanzhou, Li Nu, the son of Li Lu, visited Hormuz in Persia in 1376, converted to Islam, married a Persian or an Arab woman, and brought her back to Quanzhou. Li Nu was the ancestor of the Ming Dynasty reformer Li Chih.

In 1756, the Dutch reported that 80 Chinese families lived in Kharg Island, where they worked as farmers.

The numbers of expatriates from the People's Republic of China began to increase noticeably between 2002 and 2005.

Business and employment
Most modern Chinese expatriates work on construction or other engineering projects; a few run import/export companies or other small businesses. Large-scale investment projects are also becoming more common; businessmen from Zhejiang began building Iran's first Chinese trade complex in 2006. The 330,000 square-metre site in the south of the country, located five kilometres from Khorramshahr and twenty kilometres from the Iraqi border, is expected to contain 1,500 businesses and cost RMB600 million to complete.

Cultural integration
One People's Daily reporter described Chinese people in Iran often have trouble adapting to local life. They live in a separate sphere from Iranians. Most cannot speak much Persian. Because the number of Chinese in the country is so small, Chinese people are typically taken to be Koreans or Japanese people instead, unlike in other countries where the opposite mistake is more common. Chinese cuisine is largely unavailable. Aside from Chinese people married to Iranians, international students are the group of Chinese in Iran best integrated into mainstream society, in terms of lifestyle and language. Their total number is estimated at 100; unlike other Chinese residents, most live outside of Tehran, because the number of scholarships offered by universities in the capital has been decreasing. There is a small Chinatown in Iran built on a Chinese theme, known as Mahale Chiniha.

See also

Iranians in China
Koreans in Iran

References

Iran
Chinese diaspora in Asia
Ethnic groups in Iran
Expatriates in Iran